Margaret 'Peggy' Donaldson Smith (born 1952) is an American politician and a Democratic member of the West Virginia House of Delegates since January 12, 2009. Smith served four terms in the West Virginia Legislature representing Districts 38 and 46 from January 2009 until the present.

Education
Smith earned her B.A. with honors 
from West Virginia Wesleyan College, her M.A. and Ed.D. from West Virginia University, and her J.D. from the West Virginia University College of Law.

Elections
2014 and 2016 Smith won Primary and General  elections to represent District 46. 
2012 Redistricted to District 46, and with incumbent Representative Stan Shaver redistricted to District 53, Smith was unopposed for both the May 8, 2012 Democratic Primary, winning with 2,125 votes, and the November 6, 2012 General election, winning with 5,670 votes.
2008 When District 38 Democratic Representative Doug Stalnaker ran for West Virginia Senate and left the seat open, Smith ran in the four-way May 13, 2008 Democratic Primary and placed first with 1,498 votes (45.0%), and won the November 4, 2008 General election with 4,510 votes (65.7%) against Republican nominee Derrick Love, who had run for the seat in 2004 and 2006.
2010 Smith was unopposed for both the May 11, 2010 Democratic Primary, winning with 1,301 votes, and the November 2, 2010 General election, winning with 4,291 votes.

References

External links
Official page at the West Virginia Legislature

Margaret Smith at Ballotpedia
Peggy Donaldson Smith at OpenSecrets

1952 births
Living people
Democratic Party members of the West Virginia House of Delegates
People from Weston, West Virginia
West Virginia University College of Law alumni
West Virginia lawyers
West Virginia University alumni
West Virginia Wesleyan College alumni
Women state legislators in West Virginia
21st-century American politicians
21st-century American women politicians